The 2012 Ju-Jitsu World Championship were the 11th edition of the Ju-Jitsu World Championships, and were held in Vienna, Austria from November 30 to December 2, 2012.

Schedule 
30.11.2012 – Men's and Women's Fighting System, Men's and Women's Jiu-Jitsu (ne-waza), Women's Duo System – Classic
01.12.2012 – Men's and Women's Fighting System, Men's Duo System – Classic
02.12.2012 – Men's and Women's Fighting System, Men's and Women's Jiu-Jitsu (ne-waza), Mixed Duo System – Classic

European Ju-Jitsu

Fighting System

Men's events

Women's events

Duo System

Duo Classic events

Brazilian Jiu-Jitsu

Men's events

Women's events

Links

References

External links
Official results (PDF)